Lectionary 244, designated by siglum ℓ 244 (in the Gregory-Aland numbering) is a Greek manuscript of the New Testament, on parchment. Palaeographically it has been assigned to the 9th century. 
The manuscript has survived on only one leaf.

Description 

The codex contains lessons from the Gospels lectionary (Evangelistarium), it contains only fragments of two lessons with the texts of Luke 1:24-27 and Matthew 20:10-29.

The text is written in Greek uncial letters, on 1 parchment leaf, in two columns per page, 26 lines per page.

It uses breathings, accents, punctuation, and interrogative sign; iota subscript occurs, errors of itacism. The nomina sacra are written in an abbreviated way.

History 

It has been assigned by the Institute for New Testament Textual Research (INTF) to the 9th century.

Constantin von Tischendorf brought the manuscript from the East and gave first description of the codex. It was examined by Eduard de Muralt.

The manuscript was added to the list of New Testament manuscripts by Gregory (number 244).

The manuscript is not cited in the critical editions of the Greek New Testament (UBS3).

The codex is housed at the Russian National Library (Gr. 35) in Saint Petersburg.

See also 

 List of New Testament lectionaries
 Biblical manuscript
 Textual criticism
 Lectionary 243
 Lectionary 245

Notes and references

Bibliography 

 Constantin von Tischendorf, Anecdota sacra et profana, XIV p. 12
 Eduard de Muralt, Catalogue des manuscrits grecs de la Bibliothèque Impériale publique (Petersburg 1864), p. 21 (as XXXV)

Greek New Testament lectionaries
9th-century biblical manuscripts
National Library of Russia collection